Pathein, formerly called Bassein, is the largest city and the capital of the Ayeyarwady Region, Myanmar (Burma).  It is located 190 km (120 mi) west of Yangon within Pathein Township on the bank of the Pathein River (Pathein), which is a western branch of the Irrawaddy River, the city has a population of 237,089 (2017 census). Although once a part of the Mon kingdom, Pathein has few ethnic Mon residents today. The majority are of Bamar with a significant Karen, Burmese Indian, Rakhine and Burmese Chinese populations .

Etymology
The city's name is believed to derive from the Old Mon name, . "pha" means great or wide and sī/sɛm means river or sea. Pha-sɛm means a big sea. The name was corrupted to Bassein during the British colonial period.

An alternate theory holds that the city's name comes from the classical name of Pathein, Kusimanagara, a name used by ancient writings and the Kalyani inscriptions. Pathein itself is a corruption of Mon "Kuthen," which itself is a contraction of Kusimanagara. This is supported by the fact that the Portuguese call Pathein "Cosmim."

History

Pathein was part of the Mon kingdom. The British built a fort and established a garrison in 1826, after the First Anglo-Burmese War.
The 1983 census recorded a population of 144,092.

Geography and economy

The city is also a terminus of a branch of the main railroad line which connects it to Hinthada, Letpadan and Yangon. In the 1990s, the road network along the Irrawaddy to Monywa was improved.

The coastline along the Bay of Bengal is surrounded by the Arakan Mountains. There is also an offshore reef at Diamond Island that is popular with bathers. Diamond Island is also noted as a turtle breeding ground.

The city is a rice-milling and export centre. Aside from several rice mills, the town has numerous sawmills and umbrella workshops. The colourful handmade parasols made in Pathein are widely known throughout Burma. They are known locally as "Pathein hti". Pathein is also known for its pottery and colourful hand-made baskets and buckets. Among Pathein's most prominent industries also include production of salt, mats, and Pathein halawa. The textiles produced in Pathein Industrial Zone is, however, the largest industry economy of the city.

The surrounding area of Pathein are employed in agriculture and primarily cultivates rice. Other crops include sesames, groundnuts, jute, maize, pulse (legume)s, tobacco, chilies as well as a wide variety of fruits like banana and tamarind.

Climate
Pathein has a tropical monsoon climate (Am) according to the Köppen climate classification system. Pathein experiences a sustained period of extraordinary rainfall from June through August. The dry season which runs from December through April, begins with noticeably cooler temperatures than the remainder of the year, but becomes sweltering as the wet season approaches in March and April.

Demographics

2014

The 2014 Myanmar Census reported that Pathein had a population of 169,773, representing 59.1% of Pathein Township's total population. Pathein is subdivided into 15 urban wards.

Landmarks

Pathein has a scenic waterfront and many Buddhist temples, including the main sight of Shwemokhtaw Pagoda.

 Tagaung Mingala Pagoda
 Settawya pagoda
 Phaung Daw U Pagoda
 Clock Tower
 St Peter's Cathedral
 Pathein University
 Pathein Cultural Museum

Education

The city is home to the Pathein Education College for elementary teachers and Pathein University for arts and science students. The Computer University (Pathein) which is administered by Ministry of Science and Technology offers both undergraduate and graduate programs in computer science, and computer technology. Technological University (Pathein) which was founded in 1999, offers engineering courses.

Sports 
The 6,000-seat Ayar Stadium is one of the main venues for popular local football tournaments. The stadium is the home of Ayeyawady United F.C., a Myanmar National League (MNL) football club.

Health care 

Pathein General Hospital serves people in Pathein and its surrounding districts.

Notable people
Ba U, 2nd president of Myanmar (1952–1957) was born in Pathein in 1887.
Mahn Win Maung, 3rd president of Myanmar (1957–1962) was born in a town near Pathein in 1916.
8th president Thein Sein was also born in a village near Pathein in 1945 and studied his high school education in Pathein. 
10th president Win Myint was also born in Danuphyu town near Pathein in 1945 and started his political life in Pathein.

See also
 Phaung Daw U Pagoda
 Pathein Airport
 Ngwesaung Beach
 Chaungtha Beach

References

 
Populated places in Ayeyarwady Region
Old Cities of Mon people
Township capitals of Myanmar